Janson is a Scandinavian patronymic surname, meaning "son of Jan", derived from Johannes. There are alternate Belgian, Dutch, Danish, Latvian, Norwegian and Swedish spellings.

Surname
Notable people with this surname include:

Anton Janson (1620–1687), Dutch printer and typographer after whom the font "Janson" is named
Charles Auguste Marie Joseph, Comte de Forbin-Janson (1785–1844), French Bishop of Nancy and Toul, and founder of the Association of the Holy Childhood
Chris Janson (born 1986), American country music singer and songwriter
Ciara Janson (born 1987), English actress
David Janson (born 1950), English actor and father of Ciara Janson
Ernest A. Janson (1878–1930), highly decorated United States Marine of World War I
H. W. Janson (1913–1982), American art historian
Horst Janson (actor), German film and television actor
 Jonathan Janson (born 1950), American painter and art historian
Klaus Janson (born 1952), American comic book artist
Marie Janson (1873–1960), Belgian politician and first woman to serve in the Belgian Senate; sister of Paul-Émile Janson
Oscar Janson (born 1975), Swedish athlete
Paul Janson (1840–1913), Belgian liberal politician; father of Paul-Émile Janson and Marie Janson
Paul-Émile Janson (1872–1944), Belgian liberal politician, brother of Marie Janson
Svante Janson, Swedish mathematician

Fictional
 Paul Janson, the protagonist of The Janson Directive, a novel by Robert Ludlum
 Wes Janson, an X-Wing pilot in Rogue Squadron in the Star Wars movies and expanded universe novels

Given name
While Janson is uncommon as a given name, notable people with this first name include:

Janson Junk (born 1996), American baseball player
Janson van Keulen (1593–1661), variant name of Cornelius Johnson, English portrait painter

See also
Jansons (surname)
Jansson
Jenson (name)

Patronymic surnames